The China Aerospace Museum is a museum in Fengtai District, Beijing. It highlights the technologies of the Chinese Space Program. The museum has an area of more than 10,000 square meters. The museum was founded in October 1992. The museum has not been rated.

On display at the two hall are:

 carrier rockets
 manned spacecraft
 satellites
 moon exploration apparatus 
 section dedicate to China's space industry

References

External links 
 

Museums in Beijing
Aerospace museums in China